Rasmus Messerschmidt (born 9 June 1992) is a Danish badminton player. Messerschmidt also plays for the Bornholm team, and in 2018 he won his first senior international title at the Portugal International.

Achievements

BWF International Challenge/Series (3 titles, 1 runner-up) 
Men's singles

  BWF International Challenge tournament
  BWF International Series tournament
  BWF Future Series tournament

References

External links 
 

1992 births
Living people
Danish male badminton players